The XI Corps of the Grande Armée was a French military unit that existed during the Napoleonic Wars. In 1812, the corps was formed for the invasion of Russia and placed under Marshal Pierre Augereau. It did not fight in any battles and instead served a collection point for reserves. In spring 1813, it was reorganized and placed under the command of Marshal Jacques MacDonald. The corps fought at Lützen, Bautzen, the Katzbach, Leipzig, and Hanau in 1813. Still under MacDonald, the unit fought at Bar-sur-Aube and several minor actions in 1814.

Order of battle

November 1812
XI Corps: Marshal Pierre Augereau
 30th Infantry Division: General of Division Étienne Heudelet de Bierre
 1st Provisional Demi-Brigade
 2nd Light Infantry Regiment, 4th Battalion
 4th Light Infantry Regiment, 4th Battalion
 17th Light Infantry Regiment, 4th Battalion
 6th Provisional Demi-Brigade
 16th Light Infantry Regiment, 4th Battalion
 21st Light Infantry Regiment, 4th Battalion
 28th Light Infantry Regiment, 4th Battalion
 28th Line Infantry Regiment, 1st Battalion 
 43rd Line Infantry Regiment (2 companies)
 65th Line Infantry Regiment (1 company)
 7th Provisional Demi-Brigade
 8th Line Infantry Regiment, 4th Battalion
 14th Line Infantry Regiment, 4th Battalion
 94th Line Infantry Regiment, 4th Battalion
 8th Provisional Demi-Brigade
 54th Line Infantry Regiment, 4th Battalion
 88th Line Infantry Regiment, 4th Battalion
 95th Line Infantry Regiment, 4th Battalion
 128th Line Infantry Regiment, 3rd Battalion
 9th Provisional Demi-Brigade
 24th Line Infantry Regiment, 4th Battalion
 45th Line Infantry Regiment, 4th Battalion
 59th Line Infantry Regiment, 4th Battalion
 127th Line Infantry Regiment, 3rd Battalion
 17th Provisional Demi-Brigade
 6th Light Infantry Regiment, 4th Battalion
 25th Light Infantry Regiment, 4th Battalion
 39th Line Infantry Regiment, 4th Battalion  
 31st Infantry Division: General of Division Joseph Lagrange
 10th Provisional Demi-Brigade
 27th Line Infantry Regiment, 4th Battalion
 63rd Line Infantry Regiment, 4th Battalion
 76th Line Infantry Regiment, 4th Battalion
 96th Line Infantry Regiment, 4th Battalion
 11th Provisional Demi-Brigade
 27th Light Infantry Regiment, 4th Battalion
 50th Line Infantry Regiment, 4th Battalion
 2nd Méditerranée Regiment, 3rd Battalion
 12th Provisional Demi-Brigade
 123rd Line Infantry Regiment, 3rd Battalion
 124th Line Infantry Regiment, 4th Battalion
 125th Line Infantry Regiment, 4th Battalion
 129th Line Infantry Regiment, 4th Battalion
 13th Provisional Demi-Brigade
 5th Line Infantry Regiment, 4th Battalion
 11th Line Infantry Regiment, 4th Battalion
 79th Line Infantry Regiment, 4th Battalion
 32nd Infantry Division: General of Division Pierre François Joseph Durutte
 Brigades: unknown
 Belle-Isle Regiment, 2nd, 3rd, and 4th Battalions
 Isle de Ré Regiment, 2nd, 3rd, and 4th Battalions
 Walcheren Regiment, 2nd, 3rd, and 4th Battalions
 1st Méditerranée Regiment, 1st and 2nd Battalions
 2nd Méditerranée Regiment, 1st, 2nd, and 4th Battalions
 33rd Infantry Division: General of Brigade François Détrés
 1st Brigade: Neapolitans
 Royal Calabrian Regiment
 Naples Regiment
 Marine Battalion 
 2nd Brigade: Neapolitans
 Prince Lucien Regiment
 Garde Vélites Regiment
 34th Infantry Division: General of Division Charles Antoine Morand
 1st Brigade:
 3rd Line Infantry Regiment, 4th Battalion
 29th Line Infantry Regiment, 3rd and 4th Battalions
 105th Line Infantry Regiment, 4th Battalion
 113th Line Infantry Regiment, 3rd and 4th Battalions
 2nd Brigade:
 4th Westphalian Infantry Regiment
 Hessian Light Infantry Regiment
 4th Ducal Saxon Infantry Regiment, 4th Battalion

October 1813
XI Corps: Marshal Jacques MacDonald
 31st Infantry Division: General of Division François Roch Ledru des Essarts
 1st Brigade: General of Brigade Philibert Fressinet
 11th Provisional Line Infantry Regiment (3 battalions)
 13th Provisional Line Infantry Regiment (3 battalions)
 2nd Brigade: General of Brigade François Nizard d'Henin
 Westphalian 8th Line Infantry Regiment (2 battalions)
 Westphalian Light Infantry Regiment (1 battalion)
 3rd Brigade: General of Brigade Macdonald
 Neapolitan 4th Light Infantry Regiment (2 battalions)
 Neapolitan Elite Battalion
 Divisional Artillery:
 Westphalian Foot Battery (6 guns)
 Westphalian Foot Battery (6 guns)
 French Foot Battery (8 guns)
 35th Infantry Division: General of Division Étienne Maurice Gérard
 1st Brigade: General of Brigade Georges-Hippolyte Le Senescal
 6th Line Infantry Regiment (3 battalions)
 112th Line Infantry Regiment (4 battalions)
 2nd Brigade: General of Brigade Carlo Zucchi
 Italian 2nd Light Infantry Regiment (2 battalions)
 Italian 5th Line Infantry Regiment (4 battalions)
 Divisional Artillery: Captain Marullier 
 Italian Foot Battery (8 guns)
 Italian Horse Battery (6 guns)
 36th Infantry Division: General of Division Henri François Marie Charpentier
 1st Brigade: General of Brigade François Martin Valentin Simmer
 22nd Light Infantry Regiment (4 battalions)
 10th Line Infantry Regiment (2 battalions)
 2nd Brigade: General of Brigade Claude Marie Meunier
 3rd Light Infantry Regiment (2 battalions)
 14th Light Infantry Regiment (3 battalions)
 Divisional Artillery: Captain Bourgon 
 French Foot Battery (8 guns)
 French Foot Battery (8 guns)
 39th Infantry Division: General of Division Jean Gabriel Marchand
 1st Brigade: General-Major von Stockhorn
 Baden 1st Line Infantry Regiment (2 battalions)
 Baden 3rd Line Infantry Regiment (2 battalions)
 2nd Brigade: General-Major Louis I, Grand Duke of Hesse
 Hesse-Darmstadt Guard Fusilier Battalion
 Hesse-Darmstadt Leibgarde Regiment (2 battalions)
 Hesse-Darmstadt Leib Regiment (2 battalions)
 Divisional Artillery: Captain Bourgon 
 Baden Foot Battery (4 guns)
 Hesse-Darmstadt Foot Battery (3 guns)
 Attached to Corps: 
 Reserve Artillery: General of Division Joseph Marie de Pernety
 12-pound Foot Battery (8 guns)
 12-pound Foot Battery (8 guns)
 Foot Battery (6 guns) 
 Neapolitan Foot Battery (unknown number of guns)
 28th Light Cavalry Brigade: General of Brigade Alexandre Montbrun
 Italian 4th Chasseur-à-Cheval Regiment (2 squadrons)
 Neapolitan 2nd Chasseur-à-Cheval Regiment (4 squadrons)

Notes

References

 

GAI11